Zaire (now called the Democratic Republic of the Congo) competed at the 1996 Summer Olympics in Atlanta, United States.

Results by event

Athletics

Men
Track and road events

Basketball

Women's tournament

Roster
 Mwadi Mabika
 Lukengu Ngalula
 Kasala Kamanga
 Muene Tshijuka
 Mukendi Mbuyi
 Kakengwa Pikinini
 Zaina Kapepula
 Patricia N'Goy Benga
 Kongolo Amba
 Lileko Bonzali
 Kaninga Mbambi
 Natalie Lobela
Preliminary round - Group B

Classification round 9th–12th

11th-place match

References
Official Olympic Reports

External links
 

Nations at the 1996 Summer Olympics
1996